Coleophora glitzella is a moth of the family Coleophoridae. It is found from Fennoscandia and northern Russia to Italy and from Great Britain to Romania. It was recently reported from Yukon, Canada.

Description

The larvae feed on Vaccinium vitis-idaea and Vaccinium uliginosum. Young larvae make a frass-filled corridor, widening it into a blotch. They then cut an elongated piece of epidermis out of the upper and lower epidermis of this blotch and use it to construct the first case. In this case they overwinter. After hibernation, the larva makes a new case in the same manner. It hibernates for the second time and constructs yet another case. The case is straight. The mouth angle is about 90°. Full-grown larvae can be found at the end of April.

References

External links
 Coleophora glitzella at UKMoths

glitzella
Moths described in 1869
Moths of Asia
Moths of Europe
Moths of North America